Li Ho-Pyong (born 16 October 1951) is a Korean former wrestler who competed in the 1980 Summer Olympics.

References

1951 births
Living people
Olympic wrestlers of North Korea
Wrestlers at the 1976 Summer Olympics
Wrestlers at the 1980 Summer Olympics
North Korean male sport wrestlers
Olympic silver medalists for North Korea
Olympic medalists in wrestling
Wrestlers at the 1978 Asian Games
Medalists at the 1980 Summer Olympics
Asian Games competitors for North Korea
20th-century North Korean people